Ashville is an unincorporated community in the Rural Municipality of Gilbert Plains, Manitoba, Canada.

The community was named after Isaac Ash, a person of Irish descent who settled in the area.

The Ashville Formation, a stratigraphical unit of the Western Canadian Sedimentary Basin, was named for this community.

See also
 List of communities in Manitoba

References

Unincorporated communities in Parkland Region, Manitoba